Grupo Editorial Norma is a book publishing company based in Colombia. It also operates several web portals.

Founded in 1960, Grupo Editorial Norma today operates in most Latin American countries and in Spain where it owns several publishing houses.
Grupo Editorial Norma is part of Carvajal Educacion, that is a section of the international company Carvajal S.A. 
 
Its imprints include:
Norma Educación
Kapelusz Editora (Argentina)
Editorial Farben (Costa Rica)
Norma Libros (entertainment and information book markets)
 Parramón Ediciones (Spain)
 Granica (Spain)
 Belacqva, (Spain)

References

External links
Carvajal - Grupo Editorial Norma
 Libreria Norma

Book publishing companies of Colombia